Seyyed Sharif (also Romanized as Seyyed Sharīf) is a village in Jahad Rural District, Hamidiyeh District, Ahvaz County, Khuzestan Province, Iran. As of the 2006 census, its population was 70 in 14 families.

References 

Populated places in Ahvaz County